August H. Krock (May 9, 1866 – March 22, 1905) was an American Major League Baseball pitcher. In Krock's debut season, 1888 with the White Stockings, he had 25 wins and 14 losses.

External links

1866 births
1905 deaths
19th-century baseball players
Major League Baseball pitchers
Chicago White Stockings players
Indianapolis Hoosiers (NL) players
Washington Nationals (1886–1889) players
Buffalo Bisons (PL) players
Oshkosh (minor league baseball) players
Milwaukee Brewers (minor league) players
Milwaukee Creams players
Sioux City Corn Huskers players
Omaha Lambs players
Baseball players from Milwaukee
Baseball players from Pasadena, California